Cyperus papyrus, better known by the common names papyrus, papyrus sedge, paper reed, Indian matting plant, or Nile grass, is a species of aquatic flowering plant belonging to the sedge family Cyperaceae. It is a tender herbaceous perennial, native to Africa, and forms tall stands of reed-like swamp vegetation in shallow water.

Papyrus sedge (and its close relatives) has a very long history of use by humans, notably by the Ancient Egyptians (as it is the source of papyrus paper, one of the first types of paper ever made). Parts of the plant can be eaten, and the highly buoyant stems can be made into boats. It is now often cultivated as an ornamental plant.

In nature, it grows in full sun, in flooded swamps, and on lake margins throughout Africa, Madagascar, and the Mediterranean countries. It has been introduced outside its range to tropical regions worldwide (such as the Indian subcontinent, South America, and the Caribbean).

Description

Each culm is a single internode; the longest known of any plant. It forms a grass-like clump of triangular green stems that rise up from thick, woody rhizomes. Greenish-brown flower clusters eventually appear at the ends of the rays, giving way to brown, nut-like fruits.

Although no leaves are apparent above the soil line, the younger parts of the rhizome are covered by red-brown, papery, triangular scales, which also cover the base of the culms. Technically, these are reduced leaves, so strictly it is not quite correct to call this plant fully "leafless".

Papyrus in history

Egyptians used the plant (which they called aaru, or the subspecies C. p. papyrus, which came very close to extinction, but was rediscovered in 1968.) for many purposes, including for making papyrus paper. Its name has an uncertain origin, but was rendered in Hellenistic Greek as πάπυρος.

In the Nile Delta, Cyperus papyrus was widely cultivated in ancient times. It is for example depicted on a restored stucco fragment from the palace of Amenhotep III near the present-day village of Malkata. Currently, only a small population remains in Egypt, in Wadi El Natrun. Theophrastus's History of Plants (Book iv. 10) states that it grew in Syria, and according to Pliny's Natural History, it was also a native plant of the Niger River and the Euphrates.
Neither the explorer Peter Forsskål, an apostle of Carl Linnaeus, in the 18th century, nor the Napoleonic expedition saw it in the delta.

Aside from papyrus, several other members of the genus Cyperus may also have been involved in the multiple uses Egyptians found for the plant. Its flowering heads were linked to make garlands for the gods in gratitude. The pith of young shoots was eaten both cooked and raw. Its woody root made bowls and other utensils and was burned for fuel. From the stems were made reed boats (seen in bas-reliefs of the Fourth Dynasty showing men cutting papyrus to build a boat; similar boats are still made in southern Sudan), sails, mats, cloth, cordage, and sandals. Theophrastus states that King Antigonus made the rigging of his fleet of papyrus, an old practice illustrated by the ship's cable, wherewith the doors were fastened when Odysseus slew the suitors in his hall (Odyssey xxi. 390).

The "rush" or "reed" basket in which the Biblical figure Moses is supposed to have been placed may have been made from papyrus.

The adventurer Thor Heyerdahl had a boat built for him of papyrus, Ra, in an attempt to demonstrate that ancient African or Mediterranean people could have reached America. He was unsuccessful with this boat. Fishermen in the Okavango Delta use small sections of the stem as floats for their nets.

Ecology

It flowers in late summer, and prefers full sun to partly shady conditions. Like most tropical plants, it is sensitive to frost. In the United States, it has become invasive in Florida and has escaped from cultivation in Louisiana, California, and Hawaii.

Papyrus sedge forms vast stands in swamps, shallow lakes, and along stream banks throughout the wetter parts of Africa, but it has become rare in the Nile Delta. In deeper waters, it is the chief constituent of the floating, tangled masses of vegetation known as sudd. It also occurs in Madagascar, and some Mediterranean areas such as Sicily and the Levant.

The "feather-duster" flowering heads make ideal nesting sites for many social species of birds. As in most sedges, pollination is by wind, not insects, and the mature fruits after release are distributed by water.

Papyrus is a C4 sedge that forms highly productive monotypic stands over large areas of wetland in Africa.

Cultivation
The papyrus plant is relatively easy to grow from seed, though in Egypt, it is more common to split the rootstock, and grows quite fast once established. Extremely moist soil or roots sunken in the water is preferred and the plant can flower all year long. Vegetative propagation is the suggested process of creating new plants. It is done by splitting the rhizomes into small groups and planting normally. It can reach heights of up to 16 feet tall. C. papyrus is considered to be hardy in USDA hardiness zones 9 and 10. 

C. papyrus and the dwarf cultivar C. papyrus 'Nanus' have gained the Royal Horticultural Society's Award of Garden Merit (confirmed 2017).

Uses
In Ancient Egypt, papyrus was used for various of purposes such as baskets, sandals, blankets, medicine, incense, and boats. The woody root was used to make bowls and utensils, and was burned for fuel. The Papyrus Ebers refers to the use of soft papyrus tampons by Egyptian women in the 15th century BCE. Egyptians made efficient use of all parts of the plant. Papyrus was an important "gift of the Nile" which is still preserved and perpetuated in Egyptian culture.

References

Further reading
Boar, R. R., D. M. Harper and C. S. Adams. 1999. Biomass Allocation in Cyperus papyrus in a Tropical Wetland, Lake Naivasha, Kenya. 1999. Biotropica 3: 411.
Chapman, L.J., C.A. Chapman, R. Ogutu-Ohwayo, M. Chandler, L. Kaufman and A.E. Keiter. 1996. Refugia for endangered fishes from an introduced predator in Lake Nabugabo, Uganda. Conservation Biology 10: 554-561.
Chapman, L.J., C.A. Chapman, P.J. Schofield, J.P. Olowo, L. Kaufman, O. Seehausen and R. Ogutu-Ohwayo. 2003. Fish faunal resurgence in Lake Nabugabo, East Africa. Conservation Biology 17: 500-511.
Gaudet, John. 1975. Mineral concentrations in papyrus in various African swamps. Journal of Ecology 63: 483-491.
Gaudet, John. 1976. Nutrient relationships in the detritus of a tropical swamp.Archiv für Hydrobiologie 78: 213-239.
Gaudet, John. 1977. Natural drawdown on Lake Naivasha, Kenya and the formation of papyrus swamps. Aquatic Botany 3: 1-47.
Gaudet, John. 1977. Uptake and loss of mineral nutrients by papyrus in tropical swamps. Ecology 58: 415-422.
Gaudet, John. 1978. Effect of a tropical swamp on water quality. Verh. Internat. Ver. Limnol. 20: 2202-2206.
Gaudet, John. 1978. Seasonal changes in nutrients in a tropical swamp. Journal of Ecology 67: 953-981.
Gaudet, John. 1980. Papyrus and the ecology of Lake Naivasha. National Geographic Society Research Reports. 12: 267-272.
Gaudet, J. and J. Melack. 1981. Major ion chemistry in a tropical African lake basin. Freshwater Biology 11: 309-333.
Gaudet, J. and C. Howard-Williams. 1985. "The structure and functioning of African swamps." In (ed. Denny) The Ecology and Management of African Wetland Vegetation. Dr.w.Junk, Pub., Dordrecht (pp. 154–175).
Gaudet, John. 1991.  Structure and function of African floodplains. Journal of the East African Natural Historical Society. 82(199): 1-32.
Harper, D.M., K.M. Mavuti and S. M. Muchiri. 1990: Ecology and management of Lake Naivasha, Kenya, in relation to climatic change, alien species introductions and agricultural development. Environmental Conservation 17: 328–336.
Harper, D. 1992. The ecological relationships of aquatic plants at Lake Naivasha, Kenya. Hydrobiologia. 232: 65-71.
Howard-Williams, C. and K. Thompson. 1985. The conservation and management of African wetlands. In (ed. Denny) The Ecology and Management of African Wetland Vegetation. Dr.w.Junk, Pub., Dordrecht (pp. 203–230).
Jones, M.B. and T. R. Milburn. 1978. Photosynthesis in Papyrus (Cyperus papyrus L.), Photosynthetica. 12: 197 - 199.
Jones, M. B. and F. M. Muthuri. 1997. Standing biomass and carbon distribution in a papyrus (Cyperus Papyrus L) swamp on Lake Naivasha, Kenya. Journal of Tropical Ecology. 13: 347–356.
Jones M.B. and S. W. Humphries. 2002. Impacts of the C4 sedge Cyperus papyrus L. on carbon and water fluxes in an African wetland. Hydrobiologia, Volume 488, pp. 107–113.
Maclean, I.M.D. 2004. An ecological and socio-economic analysis of biodiversity conservation in East African wetlands. Unpublished PhD thesis, University of East Anglia, Norwich.
Maclean, I.M.D., M. Hassall, M. R. Boar and I. Lake. 2006. Effects of disturbance and habitat loss on papyrus-dwelling passerines. Biological Conservation., 131: 349-358.
Maclean, I.M.D., M. Hassall, R. Boar, R. and O. Nasirwa. 2003a. Effects of habitat degradation on avian guilds in East African papyrus Cyperus papyrus L. swamps. Bird Conservation International, 13: 283-297.
Maclean, I.M.D., R. Tinch, M. Hassall and R.R. Boar, R.R. 2003b. Social and economic use of wetland resources: a case study from Lake Bunyonyi, Uganda. Environmental Change and Management Working Paper No. 2003-09, Centre for Social and Economic Research into the Global Environment, University of East Anglia, Norwich.
Maclean, I.M.D., R. Tinch, M. Hassall and R.R. Boar. 2003c. Towards optimal use of tropical wetlands: an economic evaluation of goods derived from papyrus swamps in southwest Uganda. Environmental Change and Management Working Paper No. 2003-10, Centre for Social and Economic Research into the Global Environment, University of East Anglia, Norwich.
Messenger Dally. 1908 How papyrus defeated South Sydney and assisted in making Eastern Suburbs great
Muthuri, F. M., M. B. Jones, and S.K. Imbamba. 1989. Primary productivity of papyrus (Cyperus papyrus) in a tropical swamp - Lake Naivasha, Kenya, Biomass, 18: 1 - 14.
Muthuri, F. M. and M. B. Jones. 1997. Nutrient distribution in a papyrus swamp: Lake Naivasha, Kenya. Aquatic Botany, 56: 35–50.
Owino, A. O. and P. G. Ryan. 2006. Habitat associations of papyrus specialist birds at three papyrus swamps in western Kenya. African Journal of Ecology 44: 438-443.
Thompson, K. 1976. Swamp development in the head waters of the White Nile. In (ed.J. Rzoska) The Nile. Biology of an Ancient River.Monographiae Biologicae, 29. Dr.W. Junk b.v., The Hague.
Thompson, K., P.R. Shewry & H.W. Woolhouse. 1979. Papyrus swamp development in the Upemba Basin, Zaire: Studies of population structure in Cyperus papyrus stands. Botanical Journal of the Linn. Soc. 78: 299-316.

External links

Purdue University: Cyperus papyrus factsheet
Floridata
University of Connecticut Ecology & Evolutionary Biology Conservatory

papyrus
Aquatic plants
Flora of Africa
Fiber plants
Nile Delta

Plants described in 1753
Taxa named by Carl Linnaeus
Garden plants of Africa